Concord Peak or Pik Soglasiya is a mountain of the Pamirs, on the Afghan-Tajik border, about  south of Lake Zorkul.

References

Mountains of Tajikistan
Mountains of Afghanistan
Afghanistan–Tajikistan border
International mountains of Asia
Wakhan
Landforms of Badakhshan Province
Mountains of the Pamir